The Humanitas Prize is a writing award for American television that was first given in 1976. In 1995, eligibility expanded to include the writers of feature films.  Winners in bold.

Although the prize is awarded only to writers, this list includes only the title of the film or television show they wrote.  Additionally, it does not cover all of the Humanitas Prize categories.

1970s

1976 (1st Humanitas Awards) 
Prizes were given out in 1975 on The Today Show.

30 Minute Network or Syndicated Television
 Sunshine ("The Angel of Doom") (NBC)
 Good Times ("The Lunch Money Rip-Off") (CBS)
 Good Times ("My Girl Henrietta") (CBS)
60 Minute Network or Syndicated Television
 The Law ("Complaint Amended") (NBC)
 The Cay (NBC)
 The Waltons ("The Romance") (CBS)
90 Minute or Longer Network or Syndicated Television
 Larry (CBS)
 ABC Theater, ("The Missiles of October") (ABC)
 NBC World Premiere Movie ("The Law") (NBC)

1977 (2nd Humanitas Awards) 
30 Minute Network or Syndicated Television
 M*A*S*H ("The Interview") (CBS)
 DOC ("Oldies But Goodies") (CBS)
 M*A*S*H ("Quo Vadis, Captain Chandler?") (CBS)
60 Minute Network or Syndicated Television
 Family ("Pilot") (ABC)
 Family ("A Right and Proper Goodbye") (ABC)
 The Waltons ("The Sermon") (CBS)
90 Minute or Longer Network or Syndicated Television
 NBC World Premiere Movie ("Farewell to Manzanar") (NBC)
 Medical Story ("The Quality of Mercy") (NBC)
 My Father's House (ABC)

1978 (3rd Humanitas Awards) 
30 Minute Network or Syndicated Television
 The Mary Tyler Moore Show ("Ted's Change of Heart") (CBS)
 All in the Family ("All in the Family, Part 2") (CBS)
 M*A*S*H ("Dear Sigmund") (CBS)
60 Minute Network or Syndicated Television
 Roots ("Part IV") (ABC)
 Roots ("Part III") (ABC)
 The Waltons ("The Pony Cart") (CBS)
90 Minute or Longer Network or Syndicated Television
 Green Eyes (ABC)
 Roots ("Part VIII") (ABC)
 Something for Joey (NBC)
Special Award 
 CBS Reports ("The Fire Next Door") (CBS)

1979 (4th Humanitas Awards) 
30 Minute Network or Syndicated Television
 All in the Family ("The Brother") (CBS)
 Barney Miller ("Goodbye, Mr. Fish: Part 2") (ABC)
 The Jeffersons ("984 W. 124th St., Apt. 5C") (CBS)
60 Minute Network or Syndicated Television
 Family ("Annie Laurie") (ABC)
 Family ("The Princess in the Tower") (ABC)
 Hallmark Hall of Fame ("Taxi!!!") (NBC)
90 Minute or Longer Network or Syndicated Television
 Special Olympics (CBS)
 Breaking Up (ABC)
 The Other Side of Hell (NBC)
Special Award 
 CBS Reports ("The Aliens") (CBS)

1980s

1980 (5th Humanitas Awards) 
30 Minute Network or Syndicated Television
 Taxi ("Blind Date") (ABC)
 All in the Family ("Edith Gets Fired") (CBS)
 M*A*S*H ("Point of View") (CBS)
60 Minute Network or Syndicated Television
 Lou Grant ("Vet") (CBS)
 Hallmark Hall of Fame ("Stubby Pringle's Christmas") (NBC)
 Lou Grant ("Dying") (CBS)
90 Minute or Longer Network or Syndicated Television
 Summer of My German Soldier (NBC)
 Friendly Fire (ABC)
 Like Normal People (ABC)
Special Award
 Who Are the DeBolts? And Where Did They Get Nineteen Kids? (ABC)

1981 (6th Humanitas Awards) 
30 Minute Network or Syndicated Television
  M*A*S*H ("Dreams") (CBS)
 United States ("Uncle Charlie") (NBC)
 WKRP in Cincinnati ("God Talks to Johnny") (CBS)
60 Minute Network or Syndicated Television
 Family ("Thanksgiving") (ABC)
 The Waltons ("The Remembrance") (CBS)
 The White Shadow ("The Death of Me Yet") (CBS)
90 Minute or Longer Network or Syndicated Television
 Son-Rise: A Miracle of Love (NBC)
 'The Family Man' (CBS)
 The Gift (CBS)
Special Award
 NBC White Paper ("We're Moving Up! The Hispanic Migration") (NBC)

1982 (7th Humanitas Awards) 
30 Minute Network or Syndicated Television
 WKRP in Cincinnati ("Venus Flytrap Explains") (CBS)
 Archie Bunker's Place ("Tough Love") (CBS)
 M*A*S*H ("Blood Brothers") (CBS)
60 Minute Network or Syndicated Television
 Hill Street Blues ("Dressed to Kill") (NBC)
 Lou Grant ("Streets") (CBS)
 The White Shadow ("Reunion (Part 2)") (CBS)
90 Minute or Longer Network or Syndicated Television
 The Shadow Box (ABC)
 Leave 'Em Laughing (CBS)
 A Matter of Life and Death (CBS)
Special Award
 NBC Reports ("The Migrants, 1980") (NBC)

1983 (8th Humanitas Awards) 
30 Minute Network or Syndicated Television
 M*A*S*H ("Where There's a Will, There's a War") (CBS)
 Archie Bunker's Place ("Relapse") (CBS)
 One Day at a Time ("Mrs. O'Leary's Kid") (CBS)
60 Minute Network or Syndicated Television
 Lou Grant ("Hunger") (CBS)
 ABC Afterschool Special ("The Wave") (ABC)
 Hill Street Blues ("The World According to Freedom") (NBC)
90 Minute or Longer Network or Syndicated Television
 Divorce Wars: A Love Story (ABC)
 Bitter Harvest (NBC)
 The Marva Collins Story (CBS)
Special Award
 America Works When America Works (NBC)

1984 (9th Humanitas Awards) 
30 Minute Network or Syndicated Television
 M*A*S*H ("Who Knew?") (CBS)
 Diff'rent Strokes ("Bicycle Man, Part 2") (NBC)
 It Takes Two ("Death Penalty") (ABC)
60 Minute Network or Syndicated Television
 Hill Street Blues ("Trial By Fury") (NBC)
 Fame ("Solo Song") (NBC)
 St. Elsewhere ("Rain") (NBC)
90 Minute or Longer Network or Syndicated Television
 Special Bulletin (NBC)
 Benny's Place (ABC)
 Two of a Kind (CBS)

1985 (10th Humanitas Awards)
30 Minute Network or Syndicated Television
 Family Ties ("Not An Affair to Remember") (NBC)
 Family Ties ("Say Uncle") (NBC)
 Gimme a Break! ("Herbie") (NBC)
60 Minute Network or Syndicated Television
 Hill Street Blues ("Doris in Wonderland") (NBC)
 St. Elsewhere ("All About Eve") (NBC)
 St. Elsewhere ("Ties That Bind") (NBC)
90 Minute or Longer Network or Syndicated Television
 Choices of the Heart (NBC) 
 Memorial Day (CBS)
 Something About Amelia (ABC)

1986 (11th Humanitas Awards)
30 Minute Network or Syndicated Television
 The Cosby Show ("Theo & the Joint") (NBC)
 Family Ties ("Hotline Fever") (NBC)
 Family Ties ("Remembrance of Things Past, Part 2") (NBC)
60 Minute Network or Syndicated Television
 St. Elsewhere ("Bye, George") (NBC)
 Cagney & Lacey ("An Unusual Occurrence") (CBS)
 Hill Street Blues ("Watt a Way to Go") (NBC)
90 Minute or Longer Network or Syndicated Television
 The Dollmaker (ABC)  
 Not My Kid (CBS)
 Surviving (ABC)
Children's Animation Television
 Jim Henson's Muppet Babies ("Eight Take Away One Equals Panic") (CBS)
 CBS Storybreak ("Zucchini") (CBS)
Children's Live Action Television
 CBS Schoolbreak Special ("The Day the Senior Class Got Married") (CBS)
 CBS Schoolbreak Special ("Contract for Life: The S.A.D.D. Story") (CBS)
 Pryor's Place ("Home Free") (CBS)
Special Award
 NBC White Paper ("Vietnam, Lessons of a Lost War") (NBC)

1987 (12th Humanitas Awards) 
30 Minute Network or Syndicated Television
 The Cosby Show ("Denise's Friend") (NBC)
 The Cosby Show ("An Early Spring") (NBC)
 The Cosby Show ("Truth or Consequences") (NBC)
 Mr. Sunshine ("Pilot") (CBS)
60 Minute Network or Syndicated Television
 Cagney & Lacey ("Ordinary Hero") (CBS)
 Moonlighting ("Every Daughter's Father is a Virgin") (ABC)
 St. Elsewhere ("Sanctuary") (NBC)
90 Minute or Longer Network or Syndicated Television
 Do You Remember Love (CBS)
 Hallmark Hall of Fame ("Love Is Never Silent") (CBS)
 Love, Mary (CBS)
Children's Live Action Television
 ABC Afterschool Special ("No Greater Gift") (ABC)
 ABC Afterschool Special ("Don't Touch") (ABC)
 CBS Schoolbreak Special ("Have You Tried Talking to Patty?") (CBS)
Special Award
 CBS Reports ("The Vanishing Family: Crisis in Black America") (CBS)

1988 (13th Humanitas Awards)
30 Minute Network or Syndicated Television
 Kate & Allie ("Jennie & Jason") (CBS)
 The Cosby Show ("The March") (NBC)
 Family Ties ("My Back Pages") (NBC)
60 Minute Network or Syndicated Television
 Family Ties ("A, My Name is Alex") (NBC)
 St. Elsewhere ("A Room With A View") (NBC)
 St. Elsewhere ("Where There's Hope, There's Crosby") (NBC)
90 Minute or Longer Network or Syndicated Television
 Hallmark Hall of Fame ("Promise") (CBS)
 Alex: The Life of a Child (ABC)
 Miles To Go... (CBS)
Children's Animation Television
 The Smurfs ("The Lure of the Orb") (NBC)
 The Berenstain Bears ("Forget Their Manners") (CBS)
 Galaxy High School ("The Brain Blaster") (CBS)
Children's Live Action Television
 CBS Schoolbreak Special ("The Day They Came To Arrest the Book") (CBS)
 ABC Afterschool Special ("Teen Father") (ABC)
 CBS Schoolbreak Special ("What If I'm Gay?") (CBS)
Special Award
 Mainstreet (NBC)

1989 (14th Humanitas Awards)
30 Minute Network or Syndicated Television
 Frank's Place ("The Bridge") (CBS)
 Kate & Allie ("Brother, Can You Spare a Dime?") (CBS)
 The Wonder Years ("Pilot") (ABC)
60 Minute Network or Syndicated Television
 thirtysomething ("Business As Usual") (ABC)
 Cagney & Lacey ("Don't I Know You") (CBS)
 Cagney & Lacey ("Turn, Turn, Turn: Part 2") (CBS)
90 Minute or Longer Network or Syndicated Television
 A Gathering of Old Men (CBS)
 Proud Men (ABC)
Children's Animation Television
 The Flintstone Kids ("Rocky's Rocky Road") (ABC)
 Jim Henson's Muppet Babies ("My Muppet Valentine") (CBS)
 Little Clowns of Happytown ("Goodbye Grandma") (ABC)
Children's Live Action Television
 ABC Afterschool Special ("The Kid Who Wouldn't Quit: The Brad Silverman Story") (ABC)
 ABC Afterschool Special ("Just a Regular Kid: An AIDS Story") (ABC)
 CBS Schoolbreak Special ("Never Say Goodbye") (CBS)
Special Award
 ABC News Closeup ("They Have Souls Too") (ABC)

1990s

1990 (15th Humanitas Awards)
30 Minute Network or Syndicated Television
 The Wonder Years ("Pottery Will Get You Nowhere") (ABC)
 Baby Boom ("Guilt") (NBC)
60 Minute Network or Syndicated Television
 China Beach ("Promised Land") (ABC)
 China Beach ("Lost and Found, Part 2") (ABC)
 thirtysomething ("Elliot's Dad") (ABC)
 thirtysomething ("In Re: The Marriage of Weston") (ABC)
90 Minute or Longer Network or Syndicated Television
 God Bless the Child (ABC)
Children's Animation Television
 The New Adventures of Winnie the Pooh ("Find Her, Keep Her") (ABC)
 The Adventures of Raggedy Ann and Andy ("The Little Chicken Adventure") (CBS)
 The Chipmunks ("A Special Kind of Champion") (NBC)
Children's Live Action Television
 CBS Schoolbreak Special ("My Past Is My Own") (CBS)
 ABC Afterschool Special ("Date Rape") (ABC)
 ABC Afterschool Special ("Taking a Stand") (ABC)
Special Award
 Destined to Live (NBC)

1991 (16th Humanitas Awards)
30 Minute Network or Syndicated Television
 The Wonder Years ("Square Dance") (ABC)
 Why, Charlie Brown, Why? (CBS)
 The Wonder Years ("The Powers That Be") (ABC)
60 Minute Network or Syndicated Television
 thirtysomething ("The Other Shoe") (ABC)
 China Beach ("Dear China Beach") (ABC)
 China Beach ("How to Stay Alive in Vietnam Part 2") (ABC)
90 Minute or Longer Network or Syndicated Television
 Common Ground (CBS)
 Hallmark Hall of Fame ("My Name Is Bill W.") (CBS)
 No Place Like Home (CBS)
Children's Animation Television
 Dink, the Little Dinosaur ("Badge of Courage") (CBS)
 Dink, the Little Dinosaur ("Crusty's Baby") (CBS)
 Jim Henson's Muppet Babies ("Romancing the Weirdo") (CBS)
Children's Live Action Television
 ABC Afterschool Special ("A Town's Revenge") (ABC)
 CBS Schoolbreak Special ("American Eyes") (CBS)
 CBS Schoolbreak Special ("The Frog Girl: The Jenifer Graham Story") (CBS)
Special Award
 Raising Good Kids in Bad Times ("See Dick and Jane Lie, Cheat and Steal: Teaching Morality to Kids") (NBC)

1992 (17th Humanitas Awards)
30 Minute Network or Syndicated Television
 The Wonder Years ("Good-bye") (ABC)
 Doogie Howser, M.D. ("To Live and Die in Brentwood") (ABC)
 The Wonder Years ("The Ties That Bind") (ABC)
60 Minute Network or Syndicated Television
 thirtysomething ("Second Look") (ABC)
 China Beach ("One Small Step") (ABC)
 thirtysomething ("Fighting the Cold") (ABC)
90 Minute or Longer Network or Syndicated Television
 Lucky Day (ABC)
 Extreme Close-Up (NBC)
 Separate but Equal ("Parts I and II") (ABC)
Children's Animation Television
 Camp Candy ("Wish Upon a Fish") (NBC)
 Madeline's Christmas (The Family Channel)
 The Adventures of Super Mario Bros. 3 ("True Colors") (NBC)
Children's Live Action Television
 CBS Schoolbreak Special ("Abby, My Love") (CBS)
 CBS Schoolbreak Special ("Lies of the Heart") (CBS)
 CBS Schoolbreak Special ("Malcolm Takes a Shot") (CBS)
PBS/Cable Television
 American Playhouse ("Three Hotels") (PBS)
 Sudie and Simpson (Lifetime)
Special Awards
 The Civil War (PBS) 
 Over the Influence: Preventing Our Kids From Using Drugs and Alcohol (SYN)

1993 (18th Humanitas Awards)
30 Minute Network or Syndicated Television
 Brooklyn Bridge ("Boys of Summer") (CBS)
 Captain Planet and the Planeteers ("The Ark") (TBS)
 A Different World ("Mammy Dearest") (NBC)
 Roseanne ("This Old House") (ABC)
 The Wonder Years ("Hardware Store") (ABC)
60 Minute Network or Syndicated Television
 I'll Fly Away ("Amazing Grace") (NBC)
 Brooklyn Bridge ("When Irish Eyes Are Smiling") (CBS)
 I'll Fly Away ("Coming Home") (NBC)
90 Minute or Longer Network or Syndicated Television
 I'll Fly Away ("Pilot") (NBC)
 Broken Cord (ABC)
 China Beach ("Hello Goodbye") (ABC)
Children's Animation Television
 The New Adventures of Winnie the Pooh ("Home is Where the Home Is") (ABC)
 Winnie the Pooh and Christmas Too (ABC)
Children's Live Action Television
 CBS Schoolbreak Special ("Dedicated to the One I Love") (CBS)
 CBS Schoolbreak Special ("Different Worlds: A Story of Interracial Love") (CBS)
 Saved by the Bell ("Home for Christmas, Part 2") (NBC)
PBS/Cable Television
 Wildflower (Lifetime)
 American Playhouse ("Darrow") (PBS)
 Mark Twain and Me (Disney Channel)

1994 (19th Humanitas Awards)
30 Minute Network or Syndicated Television
 Roseanne ("Terms of Estrangement, Part 2") (ABC)
 Roseanne ("Wait 'Til Your Father Gets Home") (ABC)
 The Wonder Years ("Nose") (ABC)
60 Minute Network or Syndicated Television
 I'll Fly Away ("Comfort and Joy") (NBC)
 Life Goes On ("Bedfellows") (ABC)
 TriBeCa ("The Box") (FOX)
90 Minute or Longer Network or Syndicated Television
 Hallmark Hall of Fame ("Miss Rose White") (NBC)
 For Their Own Good (ABC)
 Jonathan: The Boy Nobody Wanted (NBC)
Children's Animation Television
 The Legend of Prince Valiant ("The Flute") (The Family Channel)
 The Little Mermaid ("Eel-Ectric City") (CBS)
 The Little Mermaid ("Message in a Bottle") (CBS)
Children's Live Action Television
 CBS Schoolbreak Special ("Big Boys Don't Cry") (CBS)
 ABC Weekend Specials ("The Parsley Garden") (ABC)
 WonderWorks ("You Must Remember This") (PBS)
PBS/Cable Television
 Cooperstown (TBS)
 American Experience ("Simple Justice") (PBS)
 American Playhouse ("Mrs. Cage") (PBS)
Special Award
 Scared Silent: Exposing and Ending Child Abuse (SYN)

1995 (20th Humanitas Awards)
30 Minute Network or Syndicated Television
 Murphy Brown ("Reaper Madness") (CBS)
 Edith Ann: A Few Pieces of the Puzzle (ABC)
 Frasier ("The Good Son") (NBC)
 The John Larroquette Show ("Amends") (NBC)
60 Minute Network or Syndicated Television
 NYPD Blue ("Personal Foul") (ABC)
 Law & Order ("Sanctuary") (NBC)
 Picket Fences ("Abominable Snowman") (CBS)
90 Minute or Longer Network or Syndicated Television
 David's Mother (CBS)
 Out of Darkness (ABC)
 There Are No Children Here (ABC)
Children's Animation Television
 American Heroes and Legends ("Johnny Appleseed") (Showtime)
 Madeline ("Madeline and the 40 Thieves") (The Family Channel)
 Madeline ("Madeline and the Missing Clown") (The Family Channel)
Children's Live Action Television
 CBS Schoolbreak Special ("Love in the Dark Ages") (CBS)
 ABC Afterschool Special ("Montana Crossroads") (ABC)
 CBS Schoolbreak Special ("If I Die Before I Wake") (CBS)
PBS/Cable Television
 And the Band Played On (HBO)
 State of Emergency (HBO)
 Strapped (HBO) 
Feature Film
 Schindler's List
 In the Name of the Father
 Searching For Bobby Fischer
 Shadowlands

1996 (21st Humanitas Awards) 
30 Minute Network or Syndicated Television
 The John Larroquette Show ("Faith") (NBC)
 Blossom ("The Date") (NBC)
 Grace Under Fire ("Grace Under Water") (ABC)
 Roseanne ("White Men Can't Kiss") (ABC)
60 Minute Network or Syndicated Television
 Party of Five ("Thanksgiving") (FOX)
 Picket Fences ("Final Judgment") (CBS)
 Chicago Hope ("Shutt Down") (CBS)
90 Minute or Longer Network or Syndicated Television
 Hallmark Hall of Fame ("A Place for Annie") (ABC)
 Heart of a Child (NBC)
 The Other Woman (CBS)
Children's Animation Television
 Whitewash (HBO)
 Rugrats ("I Remember Melville") (Nickelodeon)
 ABC Weekend Specials ("The Secret Garden") (ABC)
Children's Live Action Television
 CBS Schoolbreak Special ("Between Mother and Daughter") (CBS)
 ABC Afterschool Special ("Boys Will Be Boys") (ABC)
 Adventures in Wonderland ("The Sound and the Furry") (The Disney Channel)
PBS/Cable Television
 The Burning Season (HBO)
 Lakota Woman: Siege at Wounded Knee (TNT)
 On Promised Land (The Disney Channel)
Feature Film
 The Shawshank Redemption
 Forrest Gump
 Nobody's Fool
Special Award
 What Can We Do About Violence? (PBS)

1997 (22nd Humanitas Awards)
30 Minute Network or Syndicated Television
 Frasier ("Breaking the Ice") (NBC)
 Grace Under Fire ("No Help Wanted") (ABC)
 Home Improvement ("The Longest Day") (ABC)
60 Minute Network or Syndicated Television
 Picket Fences ("Saint Zack") (CBS)
 ER ("The Healers") (NBC)
 Homicide: Life on the Street ("A Doll's Eyes") (NBC)
 Party of Five ("Before & After") (FOX)
90 Minute or Longer Network or Syndicated Television
 Gulliver's Travels (NBC)
 Hallmark Hall of Fame ("The Boys Next Door") (CBS)
 Hallmark Hall of Fame ("Journey") (CBS)
Children's Animation Television
 Life with Louie ("Raindrops Keep Falling On My Bed") (FOX)
 The New Adventures of Madeline ("Madeline and the Treasure Hunt") (ABC)
 Santo Bugito ("The Carnivore Kid") (CBS)
Children's Live Action Television
 ABC Afterschool Special ("Fast Forward") (ABC)
 ABC Afterschool Special ("Educating Mom") (ABC)
 ABC Weekend Special ("The Secret of Lizard Woman") (ABC)
PBS/Cable Television
 Hiroshima (Showtime)
 Andersonville ("Part II") (TNT)
 A Mother's Prayer (USA)
Feature Film
 Dead Man Walking
 Babe
 A Family Thing

1998 (23rd Humanitas Awards)
30 Minute Network or Syndicated Television
 Something So Right ("Something About An Older Guy") (NBC)
 Grace Under Fire ("Pills") (ABC)
 Roseanne ("The Miracle") (ABC)
60 Minute Network or Syndicated Television
 NYPD Blue ("Taillight's Last Gleaming") (ABC)
 Chicago Hope ("The Parent Rap") (CBS)
 Chicago Hope ("A Time to Kill") (CBS)
90 Minute or Longer Network or Syndicated Television
 Hallmark Hall of Fame ("Old Man") (CBS)
 ...First Do No Harm (ABC)
 Hallmark Hall of Fame ("The Summer of Ben Tyler") (CBS)
Children's Animation Television
 Life with Louie ("The Thank You Note") (FOX)
 Little Bear ("Little Bear's Surprise") (Nickelodeon)
 Timon and Pumbaa ("Once Upon a Timon") (CBS)
Children's Live Action Television
 Lifestories: Families in Crisis ("Someone Had To Be Benny") (HBO)
 Sesame Street ("Miles' Family Reunion") (PBS)
 Shari's Passover Surprise (PBS)
PBS/Cable Television
 Miss Evers' Boys (HBO)
 Crime of the Century (HBO)
 The Twilight of the Golds (Showtime)
Feature Film
 Secrets & Lies
 Jerry Maguire
 Shine

1999 (24th Humanitas Awards)
30 Minute Network or Syndicated Television
 Murphy Brown ("Turpis Capillis Annus (Bad Hair Year)") (CBS)
 Foto-Novelas ("The Fix") (PBS)
 Frasier ("The Kid") (NBC)
60 Minute Network or Syndicated Television
 Nothing Sacred ("Proofs for the Existence of God") (ABC)
 ER ("Family Practice") (NBC)
 Homicide: Life on the Street ("Mercy") (NBC)
90 Minute or Longer Network or Syndicated Television
 Wonderful World of Disney ("Ruby Bridges") (ABC)
 NYPD Blue ("Lost Israel: Part 2") (ABC)
 The Staircase (CBS)
Children's Animation Television
 Life with Louie ("Blinded By Love") (FOX)
 Life with Louie ("Family Portrait") (FOX)
 Rugrats ("Mother's Day") (Nickelodeon)
Children's Live Action Television
 Smudge (TNT)
 Saved by the Bell: The New Class ("Putting Up Walls") (NBC)
 Shaquille O'Neal's Sports Theater ("First Time") (Nickelodeon)
PBS/Cable Television
 George Wallace ("Part II") (TNT)
 Clover (USA)
 Mother Teresa: In the Name of God's Poor (The Family Channel)
Feature Film
 Good Will Hunting (Matt Damon and Ben Affleck)
 Contact
 The Education of Little Tree

2000s

2000 (25th Humanitas Awards) 
30 Minute Network or Syndicated Television
 Sports Night ("The Six Southern Gentlemen of Tennessee") (ABC)
 Everybody Loves Raymond ("Frank's Tribute") (CBS)
 Sports Night ("The Quality of Mercy at 29K") (ABC)
60 Minute Network or Syndicated Television
 Homicide: Life on the Street ("Shades of Gray") (NBC)
 JAG ("Angels 30") (CBS)
 NYPD Blue ("Raging Bulls") (ABC)
 Rescuers: Stories of Courage ("Aart and Johtje Vos") (Showtime)
90 Minute or Longer Network or Syndicated Television
 NYPD Blue ("Hearts and Souls") (ABC)
 Mama Flora's Family ("Part II") (CBS)
 Selma, Lord, Selma (ABC)
Children's Animation Television
 Rugrats ("Hand Me Downs") (Nickelodeon)
 Pocket Dragon Adventures ("Festival of Lights") (SYN)
 Rugrats ("Autumn Leaves") (Nickelodeon)
Children's Live Action Television
 The Artists' Specials ("Degas and the Dancer") (HBO)
 City Guys ("Gift of Friendship") (NBC)
PBS/Cable Television
 Thanks of a Grateful Nation (Showtime)
 Passing Glory (TNT)
 Thicker Than Blood (TNT)
Feature Film
 October Sky
 A Civil Action
 Saving Private Ryan

2001 (26th Humanitas Awards) 
30 Minute Network or Syndicated Television
 Frasier ("Something About Dr. Mary") (NBC)
 3rd Rock from the Sun ("Dick, Who's Coming To Dinner") (NBC)
 Smart Guy ("Never Too Young") (The WB)
60 Minute Network or Syndicated Television
 The West Wing ("Take This Sabbath Day") (NBC)
 Once and Again ("Strangers and Brothers") (ABC)
 The West Wing ("In Excelsis Deo") (NBC)
90 Minute or Longer Network or Syndicated Television
 Tuesdays with Morrie (ABC)
 Anya's Bell (CBS)
 Joan of Arc ("Part II") (CBS)
Children's Animation Television
 Happily Ever After: Fairy Tales for Every Child ("The Sissy Duckling") (HBO)
 Recess ("A Science Fair to Remember") (ABC)
 Mythic Warriors ("Cadmus & Europa") (CBS)
Children's Live Action Television
 The Color of Friendship (Disney Channel)
 Caitlin's Way ("Stray") (Nickelodeon)
 Johnny Tsunami (Disney Channel)
PBS/Cable Television
 A Lesson Before Dying (HBO)
 Dash and Lilly (A&E)
 Freedom Song (TNT)
Feature Film
 The Insider
 The End of the Affair
 The Straight Story
Sundance Feature Film
 Love and Basketball
 The Big Kahuna
 What's Cooking?

2002 (27th Humanitas Awards) 
30 Minute Network or Syndicated Television
 Everybody Loves Raymond ("Ray's Journal") (CBS) 
 Frasier ("Something About Dr. Mary") (NBC)
 Malcolm in the Middle ("Traffic Ticket") (FOX)
60 Minute Network or Syndicated Television
 Once and Again ("Food for Thought") (ABC)
 ER ("A Walk in the Woods") (NBC)
 Gideon's Crossing ("The Lottery") (ABC)
 Third Watch ("After Hours") (NBC)
90 Minute or Longer Network or Syndicated Television
 Haven ("Part II") (CBS)
 Jesus ("Part II") (CBS)
 Jewel (CBS)
Children's Animation Television
 Clifford the Big Red Dog ("A New Friend") (PBS)
 Madeline ("Madeline and the Giants") (Disney Channel)
 Rocket Power ("Radical New Equipment") (Nickelodeon)
Children's Live Action Television
 Miracle in Lane 2 (Disney Channel)
 The Famous Jett Jackson ("Lost and Found") (Disney Channel)
 The Sandy Bottom Orchestra (Showtime)
PBS/Cable Television
 Wit (HBO)
 Boycott (HBO)
 What Makes a Family (Lifetime)
Feature Film
 You Can Count on Me
 Billy Elliot
 Traffic
Sundance Feature Film
 Green Dragon
 The Believer
 Dancing in September

2003 (28th Humanitas Awards) 
30 Minute Network or Syndicated Television
 Scrubs ("My Old Lady") (NBC)
 State of Grace ("Looking for God in All the Right Places") (FOX Family)
 State of Grace ("Love, Love, Me Do") (FOX Family)
60 Minute Network or Syndicated Television
 The Practice ("Honor Code") (ABC)
 The West Wing ("Two Cathedrals") (NBC)
 Band of Brothers ("Bastogne") (HBO)
90 Minute or Longer Network or Syndicated Television
 Anne Frank: The Whole Story (ABC) 
 Crossed Over (CBS)
 The Rosa Parks Story (CBS)
Children's Animation Television
 Balto II: Wolf Quest
 Arthur ("The Boy With His Head in the Clouds") (PBS)
 Harold and the Purple Crayon ("Harold's Birthday Gift") (HBO)
Children's Live Action Television
 My Louisiana Sky (Showtime)
 The Brothers Garcia ("The Student Buddy") (Nickelodeon)
PBS/Cable Television
 The Laramie Project (HBO)
 Sins of the Father (FX)
 Within These Walls (Lifetime)
Feature Film
 Iris
 A Beautiful Mind
 I Am Sam
Sundance Feature Film
 Real Women Have Curves
 Australian Rules
 Her Majesty

2004 (29th Humanitas Awards) 
30 Minute Network or Syndicated Television
 The Bernie Mac Show ("Sweet Home Chicago Part 2") (FOX)
 The Bernie Mac Show ("Sweet Home Chicago Part 1") (FOX)
 Frasier ("Rooms With A View") (NBC)
60 Minute Network or Syndicated Television
 The Practice ("Final Judgment") (ABC)
 Boomtown ("Fearless") (NBC)
 ER ("On the Beach") (NBC)
 Without a Trace ("In Extremis") (CBS)
90 Minute or Longer Network or Syndicated Television
 Our America (Showtime)
 Door To Door (TNT)
 Path to War (HBO)
Children's Animation Television
 Static Shock ("Jimmy") (The WB)
 Liberty's Kids ("Common Sense") (PBS)
 Liberty's Kids ("Liberty or Death") (PBS)
Children's Live Action Television
 A Ring of Endless Light (Disney Channel)
 Maniac Magee (Nickelodeon)
 You Wish! (Disney Channel)
Feature Film
 Antwone Fisher
 About a Boy
 The Pianist
Sundance Feature Film
 Whale Rider
 In America
 Pieces of April
 Raising Victor Vargas

2005 (30th Humanitas Awards)
30 Minute Network or Syndicated Television
 The Bernie Mac Show ("Saving Sergeant Tompkins") (FOX)
 The Bernie Mac Show ("Eye of the Tiger") (FOX)
 Scrubs ("My Screwup") (NBC)
60 Minute Network or Syndicated Television
 Joan of Arcadia ("Pilot") (CBS)
 ER ("On the Beach") (NBC)
 Joan of Arcadia ("The Uncertainty Principle") (CBS)
90 Minute or Longer Network or Syndicated Television
 Angels In America (HBO)
 Iron Jawed Angels (HBO)
 Jasper, Texas (Showtime)
Children's Animation Television
 Little Bill ("I Can Sign/The Sign for Friend") (Nickelodeon)
 Arthur ("Big Horns George") (PBS)
 Little Bill ("A Ramp for Monty") (Nickelodeon)
Children's Live Action Television
 Crown Heights (Showtime)
 Full-Court Miracle (Disney Channel)
 Going to the Mat (Disney Channel)
Feature Film
 Dirty Pretty Things
 Finding Nemo
 Seabiscuit
Sundance Feature Film
 Mean Creek
 Garden State
 The Woodsman

2006 (31st Humanitas Awards) 

60 Minute Network or Syndicated Television
 The West Wing ("NSF Thurmont") (NBC)
 ER ("Alone in a Crowd") (NBC)
 House ("Damned If You Do") (FOX)
 House ("Everybody Lies") (FOX)
90 Minute or Longer Network or Syndicated Television
 Lackawanna Blues (HBO)
 Ike: Countdown to D-Day (A&E)
 Saving Milly (CBS)
Children's Animation Television
 Jakers! The Adventures of Piggley Winks ("Waking Thor") (PBS)
 PAZ ("Things Change") (Discovery Kids/TLC)
 Toddworld ("Who's Your Best Friend?") (Discovery Kids/TLC)
Children's Live Action Television
 Searching for David's Heart (ABC Family)
 Buffalo Dreams (Disney Channel)
 Carry Me Home (Showtime)
Feature Film
 Hotel Rwanda
 Finding Neverland
 Millions
Sundance Feature Film
 The Motel
 Love, Ludlow
 Swimmers

2007 (32nd Humanitas Awards) 
30 Minute Network or Syndicated Television
 My Name Is Earl ("Pilot") (NBC)
 George Lopez ("The Kidney Stays In The Picture") (ABC)
 Scrubs ("My Way Home") (NBC)
60 Minute Network or Syndicated Television
 House ("Three Stories") (FOX)
 ER ("Darfur") (NBC)
 Law & Order: Special Victims Unit ("Ripped") (NBC)
90 Minute or Longer Network or Syndicated Television
 The Girl in the Café (HBO)
 The Colt (Hallmark)
 Warm Springs (HBO)
Children's Animation Television
 Miss Spider's Sunny Patch Friends ("A Froggy Day In Sunny Patch") (Nickelodeon)
 Maya & Miguel ("Miguel's Wonderful Life") (PBS)
 ToddWorld ("Benny's Missing Chew Toy") (TLC)
Children's Live Action Television
 Edge of America (Showtime)
 Felicity: An American Girl Adventure (The WB)
 High School Musical (Disney Channel)
Feature Film
 Crash
 The Chronicles of Narnia: The Lion, the Witch and the Wardrobe
 Glory Road
Sundance Feature Film
 Quinceanera
 Punching at the Sun
 Wristcutters: A Love Story

2008 (33rd Humanitas Awards) 
30 Minute Network or Syndicated Television
 The New Adventures of Old Christine ("Oh God, Yes") (CBS)
 Scrubs ("My Fallen Idol") (NBC)
 The War at Home ("Kenny Doesn't Live Here Anymore") (FOX)
60 Minute Network or Syndicated Television
 ER ("There Are No Angels Here") (NBC)
 House ("House vs. God") (FOX)
 The West Wing ("Election Day Part 2") (NBC)
90 Minute or Longer Network or Syndicated Television
 Longford (HBO)
 Tsunami: The Aftermath ("Part II") (HBO)
 Why I Wore Lipstick to My Mastectomy (Lifetime)
Children's Animation Television
 Jakers! The Adventures of Piggley Winks ("The Gift") (PBS)
 Maya & Miguel ("Give Me A Little Sign") (PBS)
 Miss Spider's Sunny Patch Friends ("The Prince, The Princess And The Bee") (Nickelodeon)
Children's Live Action Television
 Molly: An American Girl on the Home Front (Disney Channel)
 Jump In! (Disney Channel)
Feature Film
 Freedom Writers
 Venus
 Amazing Grace
Sundance Feature Film
 Where God Left His Shoes
 Ezra
 Waitress

2009 (34th Humanitas Awards) 
30 Minute Network or Syndicated Television
 Scrubs ("My Long Goodbye") (NBC)
 The Bill Engvall Show ("Aloha, Raffles") (TBS)
 In Treatment ("Sophie: Week Two") (HBO)
60 Minute Network or Syndicated Television
 John Adams ("Join or Die") (HBO)
 Boston Legal ("Roe V. Wade: The Musical") (ABC)
 The Wire ("Late Editions") (HBO)
90 Minute or Longer Network or Syndicated Television
 Bury My Heart At Wounded Knee (HBO)
 Charlie & Me (Hallmark)
 Hallmark Hall of Fame ("Pictures of Hollis Woods") (CBS)
 A Life Interrupted (Lifetime)
Children's Animation Television
 My Friends Tigger & Pooh ("Eeyore's Sad Day") (Disney Channel)
 Sweet Blackberry Presents ("The Journey of Henry Box Brown") (HBO)
 ToddWorld ("Come Out Of Your Shell") (TLC)
Children's Live Action Television
 Johnny Kapahala: Back on Board (Disney Channel)
 Minutemen (Disney Channel)
 Sheira & Loli's Dittydoodle Works ("Sacrifice") (WLIW)
Feature Film
 The Diving Bell and the Butterfly
 Lars and the Real Girl
 Juno
Sundance Feature Film
 A Raisin in the Sun
 Henry Poole Is Here
 The Visitor

2010s

2010 (35th Humanitas Awards) 
30 Minute Network or Syndicated Television
 Scrubs ("My Last Words") (ABC)
 30 Rock ("Believe in the Stars") (NBC)
 How I Met Your Mother ("Happily Ever After") (CBS)
 The Simpsons ("All About Lisa") (FOX)
60 Minute Network or Syndicated Television
 Friday Night Lights ("Tomorrow Blues") (NBC)
 ER ("Heal Thyself") (NBC)
 House ("Unfaithful") (FOX)
 Law & Order: Special Victims Unit ("Swing") (NBC)
90 Minute or Longer Network or Syndicated Television
 Taking Chance (HBO)
 Gifted Hands: The Ben Carson Story (TNT)
 Pedro (MTV)
Children's Live Action Television
 South of Nowhere ("Spencer's 18th Birthday") (The N)
 True Jackson, VP ("The Rival") (Nickelodeon)
 True Jackson, VP ("Pilot") (Nickelodeon)
Feature Film
 WALL-E
 Doubt
 Milk
 The Secret Life of Bees
 Slumdog Millionaire
Sundance Feature Film
 Amreeka
 The Anarchist's Wife
 The Greatest

2011 (36th Humanitas Awards) 
30 Minute Network or Syndicated Television
 Modern Family ("Pilot") (ABC)
 Nurse Jackie ("Pilot") (Showtime)
 Meet the Browns ("Meet The Racist") (TBS)
 The Middle ("The Block Party") (ABC)
 The Simpsons ("The Greatest Story Ever D'ohed") (FOX)
60 Minute Network or Syndicated Television
 Glee ("Wheels") (FOX)
 The Good Wife ("Pilot") (CBS)
 Breaking Bad ("Peekaboo") (AMC)
 Grey's Anatomy ("Give Peace a Chance") (ABC)
 In Treatment ("Walter: Week Six") (HBO)
 Men of a Certain Age ("Father's Fraternity") (TNT)
90 Minute or Longer Network or Syndicated Television
 Temple Grandin (HBO)
 Amish Grace (Lifetime)
 Endgame (PBS)
Documentary Award
 A Small Act (HBO)
 Freedom Riders (PBS)
 Waste Land
Feature Film
 Precious
 The Hurt Locker
 The Little Traitor
 The Messenger
Sundance Feature Film
 Winter's Bone
 The Kids Are All Right
 Night Catches Us

2012 (37th Humanitas Awards) 
30 Minute Network or Syndicated Television
 Modern Family ("The Kiss") (ABC)
 The Big C ("Taking The Plunge") (Showtime)
 How I Met Your Mother ("Last Words") (CBS)
 Nurse Jackie ("Monkey Bits") (Showtime)
60 Minute Network or Syndicated Television
 Friday Night Lights ("Always") (NBC)
 Drop Dead Diva ("Good Grief") (Lifetime)
 House ("Help Me") (FOX)
 The Pacific ("Home") (HBO)
90 Minute or Longer Network or Syndicated Television
 Thurgood (HBO)
 Reviving Ophelia (Lifetime)
 Taken From Me: The Tiffany Rubin Story (Lifetime)
Children's Animation Television
 Kung Fu Panda Holiday Special (NBC)
Documentary Award
 Louder Than a Bomb
 Being Elmo: A Puppeteer's Journey
 Neshoba
Feature Film
 The King's Speech
 127 Hours
 The Fighter
Sundance Feature Film
 Win Win
 Gun Hill Road
 Meek's Cutoff

2013 (38th Humanitas Awards) 
30 Minute Network or Syndicated Television
 Modern Family ("Aunt Mommy") (ABC)
 The Big C ("A Little Death") (Showtime)
 The Middle ("The Map") (ABC)
60 Minute Network or Syndicated Television
 Grey's Anatomy ("White Wedding") (ABC)
 Rescue Me ("Ashes") (FX)
 Blue Bloods ("The Job") (HBO)
 Parenthood ("Remember Me? I'm The One Who Loves You") (NBC)
90 Minute or Longer Network or Syndicated Television
 Cinema Verite (HBO)
 Hallmark Hall of Fame ("Beyond the Blackboard") (CBS)
 Hallmark Hall of Fame ("Have a Little Faith") (ABC)
Children's Animation Television
 Pound Puppies ("I Never Barked For My Father") (The Hub)
Children's Live Action Television
 Radio Rebel (Disney Channel)
Documentary Award
 I Am
 Serving Life (OWN)
 Buck
 Crime After Crime
Feature Film
 The Conspirator
 The Descendants
 Hugo
 Shame 
Sundance Feature Film
 Beasts of the Southern Wild
 LUV
 Middle of Nowhere

2014 (39th Humanitas Awards) 
30 Minute Network or Syndicated Television
 Modern Family ("Party Crasher") (ABC)
 The New Normal ("The Godparent Trap") (NBC)
 Nurse Jackie ("Disneyland Sucks") (Showtime)
60 Minute Network or Syndicated Television
 Bones ("The Patriot In Purgatory") (FOX)
 House ("Everybody Dies") (FOX)
 Monday Mornings ("Truth Or Consequences") (TNT)
90 Minute or Longer Network or Syndicated Television
 Hallmark Hall of Fame ("Firelight") (ABC)
 Abducted: The Carlina White Story (Lifetime)
 Betty and Coretta (Lifetime)
Children's Live Action Television
 Let It Shine (Disney Channel)
Documentary Award
 Ethel
 Mea Maxima Culpa: Silence in the House of God (HBO)
 Project Nim
Feature Film
 Silver Linings Playbook
 Django Unchained
 Flight
Sundance Feature Film
 Fruitvale Station
 The Inevitable Defeat of Mister & Pete
 Mud

2015 (40th Humanitas Awards)
30 Minute Network or Syndicated Television
 Modern Family ("Under Pressure") (ABC)
 How I Met Your Mother ("Last Forever" Part 2) (CBS)
 The Middle ("Happy Halloween IV: The Ghost Story") (ABC)
60 Minute Network or Syndicated Television
 Homeland ("The Star") (Showtime)
 Parenthood ("The Pontiac") (NBC)
 The Killing ("Six Minutes") (AMC)
 True Detective ("Form and Void") (HBO)
90 Minute or Longer Network or Syndicated Television
 The Normal Heart (HBO)
 Mary And Martha (HBO)
 Ring Of Fire (Lifetime)
Documentary Award
 The Case Against 8
 Finding Vivian Maier
 Merchants Of Doubt
Feature Film
 12 Years A Slave
 Belle
 Nebraska
Sundance Feature Film
 Whiplash
 Hellion
 Love Is Strange
 Camp X-Ray

2016 (41st Humanitas Awards)
30 Minute Network or Syndicated Television
 The Middle ("The Graduate") (ABC)
 Blackish ("Please Don't Ask, Please Don't Tell") (ABC)
 Unbreakable Kimmy Schmidt ("Kimmy Goes Outside!") (Netflix)
60 Minute Network or Syndicated Television
 Orange Is the New Black ("Trust No Bitch") (Netflix)
 Madam Secretary ("Face the Nation") (CBS)
 The Affair ("Pilot") (Showtime)
Children's Animation Television
 Arthur ("The Tardy Tumbler") (PBS)
Children's Live Action Television
 Gortimer Gibbon's Life on Normal Street ("Gortimer and the Surprise Signature") (Amazon)
 Gortimer Gibbon's Life on Normal Street ("Ranger and the Legend of Pendragon's Gavel") (Amazon)
 Liv and Maddie ("Rate-A-Rooney") (Disney Channel)
Documentary Award
 Landfill Harmonic
 Citizenfour
 Southern Rites
Feature Film
 Still Alice
 Testament of Youth
 The Good Lie
Sundance Feature Film
 Me and Earl and the Dying Girl
 Dope
 Experimenter

2017 (42nd Humanitas Awards)

30 Minute Network or Syndicated Television
 Black-ish ("Hope") (ABC)
 The Real O'Neals ("The Real Grandma") (ABC)
Grace and Frankie ("The Party") (Netflix)
60 Minute Network or Syndicated Television
 This Is Us ("Pilot") (NBC)
 The Night Of ("The Call of the Wild") (HBO)
Madam Secretary ("Waiting For Taleju") (CBS)
Children's Animation Television
 Sofia the First ("Dads and Daughters Day") (Disney Junior)
 Nina's World ("Nina's Brother for a Day") (Universal Kids)
 The Lion Guard ("Never Judge a Hyena by its Spots") (Disney Channel)
Children's Live Action
 An American Girl Story – Melody 1963: Love Has to Win (TV movie) (Amazon Studios)
 Degrassi: Next Class (""#TurntUp"") (Family Channel)
 Girl Meets World ("Girl Meets the Forgiveness Project") (Disney Channel)
Documentary Award
 13th (shared)
 Jim: The James Foley Story (shared)
 120 Days
Feature Film
 Hidden Figures (shared)
 Hacksaw Ridge (shared)
 Arrival

Sundance Feature Film
 The Birth of a Nation
 First Girl I Loved
 The Fundamentals of Caring
 Tallulah

2018 (43rd Humanitas Awards)

For the 2018 awards, feature films were separated into three categories.

30 Minute Network or Syndicated Television
 The Big Bang Theory ("The Long Distance Dissonance") (CBS)
 Black-ish ("Lemons") (ABC)
Will & Grace ("Grandpa Jack") (NBC)

60 Minute Network or Syndicated Television
 The Good Doctor ("Burnt Food") (ABC)
 Game of Thrones ("The Dragon and the Wolf") (HBO)
Madam Secretary ("Good Bones") (CBS)

Children's Animation
 Doc McStuffins ("Hannah the Brave") (Disney Junior)
 Sofia the First ("The Crown of Blossoms") (Disney Channel)
 Splash and Bubbles (PBS Kids)

Children's Live Action
 Degrassi: Next Class ("#ImSleep") (Family Channel / Netflix)
 An American Girl Story – Ivy & Julie 1976: A Happy Balance (TV movie)
 Sesame Street ("The Magical Wand Chase: A Sesame Street Special") (PBS / HBO)

Documentary Award
 Cries from Syria  
 One of Us 
 Human Flow 
 Hearing Is Believing

Feature Film, Drama
 Mudbound (shared)
 The Post (shared)
 Three Billboards Outside Ebbing, Missouri

Feature Film, Comedy
 Lady Bird 
 The Big Sick 
 The Meyerowitz Stories (New and Selected)

Feature Film, Family
 Ferdinand 
 Coco
 The Breadwinner

Sundance Feature Film
 Crown Heights
 Gook
 Novitiate

2019 (44th Humanitas Awards)
Nominees were announced on 27 November 2018, and the prizes were awarded in 2019.

30-Minute Comedy
 Dear White People ("Volume 2, Chapter VIII") (Netflix) (shared)
The Marvelous Mrs. Maisel ("Mid-way to Mid-town") (Amazon Prime) (shared)
 One Day at a Time ("Hello, Penelope") (Netflix)
The Good Place ("Jeremy Bearimy") (Netflix)

60-Minute Drama
 God Friended Me ("Pilot") (CBS)
 Orange Is the New Black ("Be Free") (Netflix)
The Good Doctor ("More") (ABC)
This is Us (“This Big, Amazing, Beautiful Life”) (NBC)

Children's Teleplay
 Alexa & Katie ("Winter Formal, Part 2") (Netflix)
 My Little Pony: Friendship Is Magic ("Surf and/or Turf") (Discovery Family)
 Muppet Babies (“You Say Potato, I Say Best Friend”) (Disney Junior)
Z-O-M-B-I-E-S (Disney Channel)

Documentary Award
 Stolen Daughters: Kidnapped by Boko Haram  
 TransMilitary 
 The Fourth Estate, “Part 3: American Carnage” 
 The Price of Free

Feature Film, Drama
 On the Basis of Sex
 Black Panther
 Boy Erased
 What They Had

Feature Film, Comedy
 Love, Simon 
 Boundaries 
 Crazy Rich Asians
 Eighth Grade

Feature Film, Family
 Mary Poppins Returns 
 Christopher Robin
 Incredibles 2
 Isle of Dogs

Independent Feature Film
 Brian Banks
 Laugh or Die
 Sorry to Bother You
 The Grizzlies
 The Rider

2020s

2020 (45th Humanitas Awards)
Nominees were announced on 15 November 2019. For the first time, there were awards for "Limited Series, TV Movie or Special" and "Short Film". The awards were presented 24 January 2020 at The Beverly Hilton.
 
Comedy Teleplay
Veep ("South Carolina") (HBO)
 Shrill ("Annie") (Hulu)
Black-ish ("Black Like Us") (ABC)
 Atypical ("Road Rage Paige") (Netflix)Drama Teleplay The Handmaid's Tale ("Useful") (Hulu)
 This Is Us ("Our Little Island Girl") (NBC)
 POSE ("In My Heels") (FX)
The Twilight Zone ("Replay") (CBS All Access)Children's Teleplay Elena of Avalor (“Changing of the Guard”) (Disney Junior)
 The Loud House ("Racing Hearts") (Nickelodeon)
 A Series of Unfortunate Events ("Penultimate Peril: Part 1") (Netflix)
Niko and the Sword of Light ("The Automatron") (Amazon Video)Limited Series, TV Movie or Special When They See Us ("Part 4") (Netflix)
 True Detective ("Now Am Found") (HBO)
 Chernobyl ("Vichnaya Pamyat") (HBO / Sky UK)
 Live in Front of a Studio Audience: Norman Lear's All in the Family and The Jeffersons (ABC)Documentary This Is Football ("Redemption") Torn Apart: Separated at the Border  
 Ernie & Joe: Crisis Cops 
 Sea of ShadowsFeature Film, Drama A Beautiful Day in the Neighborhood
 A Hidden Life
 Dark Waters
 Bombshell

Feature Film, Comedy or Musical
 Jojo Rabbit
 The Farewell 
 Yesterday
 The Laundromat

Feature Film, Family
 Frozen II
 The Peanut Butter Falcon
 Toy Story 4
 Klaus

Independent Feature Film
 End of Sentence
 Hotel Mumbai
 Brittany Runs a Marathon
 Clemency

Short Film
Kitbull
 Variables
 Purl
 They Charge for the Sun

2022 (46th Humanitas Awards)
Winners were announced on 9 September 2022 at an event held at the Beverly Hilton Hotel hosted by comedian Larry Wilmore. For the first time, an award was presented in Web Series. Prize winners are in bold.
 
Comedy Teleplay
black-ish ("If a Black Man Cries in the Woods...") (ABC)
 Abbott Elementary ("Pilot") (ABC)
Somebody Somewhere ("BFD") (HBO)
 The Conners ("Triggered") (ABC)Drama Teleplay Pachinko ("Chapter One") (Apple TV+)
 Chicago P.D. ("Burnside") (NBC)
 Queen Sugar ("May 27, 2020") (OWN)
Swagger ("Radicals") (Apple TV+)
This is Us ("The Challenger") (NBC)Children's Teleplay El Deafo' (Apple TV+)
 Karma's World ("Hair Comes Trouble") (Netflix)
 Snoopy Presents: To Mom (and Dad), with Love (Apple TV+)The Babysitters Club ("Claudia and the Sad Goodbye") (Netflix)

Limited Series, TV Movie or Special
 Women of the Movement ("Mother and Son") (ABC / Hulu)
 Love Life ("Mia Hines") (HBO)
 Maid ("Snaps") (Netflix)
 Three Months (Paramount+)Documentary In the Same Breath End of the Line: The Women of Standing Rock  
 Frederick Douglass: In Five Speeches 
 Through Our Eyes: 'ShelterFeature Film, Drama The Starling A Hero
 CODA
 Nine DaysFeature Film, Comedy Don't Look Up Everything Everywhere All at Once 
 Queen Bees
 Tick, Tick... Boom!Feature Film, Family Encanto 8-Bit Christmas
 Cinderella
 SpinShort Film Girls Are Strong Here Far from the Tree
 Leap
 NonaWeb SeriesThe Disappointments'''

References

External links 
Writers Guild Foundation

American television awards
American film awards
Television lists